The Hunter 310 is an American sailboat, that was designed by the Hunter Design Team and first built in 1997.

The 310 design was developed into the Hunter 320 in 2000.

Production
The boat was built by Hunter Marine in the United States, but it is now out of production.

Design

The Hunter 310 is a small recreational keelboat, built predominantly of fiberglass. It has a fractional sloop Bergstrom & Ridder rig, an internally-mounted spade-type rudder and a fixed fin keel. It displaces  and carries  of ballast.

The design has a PHRF racing average handicap of 168 with a high of 182 and low of 162.

Operational history

A review by Darrell Nicholson of Practical Sailor described the design as an "innovative family boat typifies Hunter’s design philosophy with its B&R rig, radar arch, circular cockpit and good value, but owners cite numerous niggling problems." On saling performance he wrote, "Sailing performance depends on a variety of elements. When hull form, sail plan, displacement, and foil shapes harmonize, the 310 sings, but that doesn’t always happen .. her sail area is small, just 455 sq. feet, less than any cruiser —save the Catalina 30 short rig—in her class. On the drawing board the 310's sail area may balance her design displacement. On the water a small sail plan usually gets overwhelmed by actual displacement. It's nice to have sailpower in reserve when the inevitable weight of cruising gear gets added to a boat. The 310 has no such margin. This hampers pure performance, but allows pleasing performance—that combination of good speed, sailing ease, and a sense of security that can make a boat fun even if she isn't overly fast. The 310 is a good example of how Hunter tries to keep the sizzle in sailing while tuning down the complexity and factoring out the fear."

See also
List of sailing boat types

Similar sailboats
Allmand 31
Beneteau 31
Catalina 310
Corvette 31
Douglas 31
Herreshoff 31
Hunter 31
Hunter 31-2
Marlow-Hunter 31
Niagara 31
Nonsuch 324
Roue 20
Tanzer 31

References

External links

Official sales brochure

Keelboats
1990s sailboat type designs
Sailing yachts
Sailboat type designs by Hunter Design Team
Sailboat types built by Hunter Marine